The 2011 FIBA Asia Championship qualification was held in late 2010 and early 2011 with the Gulf region, West Asia, Southeast Asia, East Asia and Middle Asia (Central Asia and South Asia) each conducting tournaments.

Qualification format
The following are eligible to participate:

 The organizing country.
 The champion team from the previous FIBA Asia Stanković Cup.
 The four best-placed teams from the previous FIBA Asia Stanković Cup will qualify the same number of teams from their respective sub-zones.
 The two best teams from the sub-zones.

FIBA Asia Stanković Cup

Qualified teams

East Asia

The 2011 East Asia Basketball Championship is the qualifying tournament for the 2011 FIBA Asia Championship. It also serves as a regional championship involving East Asian basketball teams. the three best teams excluding China qualifies for 2011 FIBA Asia Championship. The tournament was held from June 10 to 15, 2011 in Nanjing, China.

Preliminary round

Group A

Group B

Classification 5th–6th

Final round

Semifinals

3rd place

Final

Final standing

Gulf
The 12th Gulf Basketball Championship is the qualifying tournament for the FIBA Asia Championship 2011. it also serves as a regional championship. the three best teams qualifies for FIBA Asia Championship 2011.

Preliminary round

Final round

Semifinals

3rd place

Final

Final standing

Middle Asia – SAARC
The 2011 Middle Asia qualifying tournament for SAARC teams was held from July 13 to 15, 2011 in New Delhi, India. The best team qualifies for 2011 FIBA Asia Championship.

Preliminary round

Group A

Group B

Final round

Semifinals

3rd place

Final

Final standing

Middle Asia – Stans
The 2011 Middle Asia qualifying tournament for ‘Stans’ section of the Middle Asia was held on July 31, 2011 in Navoiy, Uzbekistan. The best team qualifies for 2011 FIBA Asia Championship. Afghanistan was supposed to play in this tournament but Uzbekistan's foreign ministry did not authorize the visas to travel to the tournament.

Southeast Asia
The 2011 Southeast Asia Basketball Association Championship is the qualifying tournament for the 2011 FIBA Asia Championship; it also serves as a regional championship involving Southeast Asian basketball teams. It was held on June 23 to June 26, 2011 at Jakarta, Indonesia. The top three finishers qualifies to the 2011 FIBA Asia Championship.

Preliminary round

Final

Final standing

West Asia
The 2011 WABA Championship is the qualifying tournament for the 2011 FIBA Asia Championship. It also serves as a regional championship involving West Asian basketball teams. the three best teams qualifies for 2011 FIBA Asia Championship. The tournament was held from June 23 to 25, 2011 in Duhok, Iraq.

References

External links
fibaasia.net
Gulf Cup Results
East Asia Results
West Asia Results
Southeast Asia Results
Middle Asia SAARC Results

2011
qual
SEABA Championship
East Asia Basketball Championship
West Asian Basketball Championship
Qual